Rita Seamon (died July 14, 2022) was an American bridge player.

Rita won a North American championship in 1974 playing with her husband William Seamon. She placed second twice in the Women's Pairs playing with her daughter Janice Seamon-Molson.

Personal life 
Her husband William Seamon was also a bridge player.

Rita and William had three children: Rick, Michael and Janice. Michael Seamon and  Janice Seamon-Molson are both bridge players.

Bridge accomplishments

Wins

 North American Bridge Championships (1)
 Chicago Mixed Board-a-Match (1) 1974

Runners-up

 North American Bridge Championships (3)
 Wagar Women's Knockout Teams (1) 1996 
 Whitehead Women's Pairs (2) 1961, 1989

References

American contract bridge players